Rhizobium etli is a Gram-negative root-nodule bacterium.

References

Rhizobiaceae